Walter d'Eynsham, also known as Walter de Hempsham was a medieval Archbishop of Canterbury-elect.

Walter was a monk of Christ Church Priory in Canterbury, when he was chosen to be the Archbishop of Canterbury on 3 August 1228 by his fellow monks of the cathedral chapter. His appointment was over-ruled by King Henry III of England and Pope Gregory IX on 5 January 1229. He was examined by a group of cardinals on theological matters and declared to have answered badly, thus allowing the pope to declare him ineligible for the office.

Citations

References

 
 
 

13th-century English Roman Catholic archbishops
Archbishops of Canterbury
13th-century Christian monks